Macheret Trench, Livingston Island
 Machete Hook, Livingston Island
 Macrobius Cove, Graham Coast
 Madan Saddle, Smith Island  
 Madara Peak, Livingston Island 
 Madrid Dome, Oscar II Coast 
 Madzharovo Point, Anvers Island  
 Maglenik Heights, Sentinel Range  
 Maglizh Rocks, Smith Island 
 Magura Glacier, Livingston Island  
 Makresh Rocks, Robert Island  
 Malak Sechko Cove, Nelson Island
 Malamir Knoll, Greenwich Island  
 Malasar Peak, Sentinel Range
 Maleshevo Cove, Livingston Island 
 Malina Cove, Low Island 
 Malkoch Peak, Sentinel Range  
 Malorad Glacier, Trinity Peninsula  
 Malyovitsa Crag, Livingston Island  
 Mamarchev Peak, Sentinel Range 
 Manastir Peak, Oscar II Coast 
 Mancho Buttress, Trinity Peninsula  
 Manole Pass, Sentinel Range 
 Manolov Glacier, Alexander Island 
 Marash Peak, Nordenskjöld Coast 
 Marchaevo Peak, Oscar II Coast 
 Marinka Point, Brabant Island
 Maritsa Peak, Livingston Island  
 Markeli Point, Smith Island  
 Marla Glacier, Trinity Peninsula
 Marmais Point, Trinity Peninsula  
 Marsa Glacier, Sentinel Range
 Marten Crag, Trinity Peninsula
 Marvodol Glacier, Fallières Coast
 Maslarov Nunatak, Nordenskjöld Coast
 Masteyra Island, Anvers Island
 Mateev Cove, Livingston Island 
 Mateev Point, Low Island 
 Matochina Peak, Smith Island 
 Matov Peak, Davis Coast 
 Maystora Peak, Greenwich Island
 Meana Point, Nelson Island
 Mount Mecheva, Foyn Coast 
 Mechit Buttress, Danco Coast
 Mechka Island, Wilhelm Archipelago
 Meda Nunatak, Foyn Coast
 Mediolana Bluff, Brabant Island
 Medovene Point, Smith Island
 Meduza Island, Wilhelm Archipelago
 Medven Glacier, Livingston Island 
 Melanita Island, Trinity Island
 Meldia Rock, Nelson Island 
 Melnik Peak, Livingston Island  
 Melnik Ridge, Livingston Island  
 Melta Point, Livingston Island 
 Melyane Island, Livingston Island 
 Memolli Nunatak, Sentinel Range
 Mendoza Cove, Elephant Island
 Mesta Peak, Livingston Island
 Metis Island, Biscoe Islands  
 Metlichina Ridge, Oscar II Coast
 Mezdra Point, Snow Island  
 Mezek Peak, Smith Island
 Mida Island, Wilhelm Archipelago  
 Midzhur Peak, Sentinel Range
 Mihaylovski Cove, Livingston Island
 Mihaylovski Crag, Oscar II Coast
 Mihnevski Peak, Oscar II Coast
 Mikov Nunatak, Nordenskjöld Coast
 Mikre Beach, Snow Island  
 Miladinovi Islets, Desolation Island  
 Miletich Point, Greenwich Island  
 Milev Rocks, Robert Island  
 Milkov Point, Davis Coast  
 Miller Spur, Danco Coast
 Mindya Cove, Tower Island 
 Minzuhar Glacier, Oscar II Coast 
 Mirovyane Peak, Sentinel Range
 Mishev Bluff, Liège Island 
 Mishka Island, Wilhelm Archipelago
 Misionis Bay, Pickwick Island 
 Mitev Glacier, Brabant Island 
 Mitino Buttress, Graham Coast
 Mitkaloto Peak, Danco Coast 
 Miziya Peak, Livingston Island
 Mneme Lake, Livingston Island
 Modev Peak, Two Hummock Island  
 Modren Peak, Sentinel Range
 Mogilyane Peak, Trinity Peninsula 
 Mokren Bight, Astrolabe Island  
 Molerov Spur, Nordenskjöld Coast
 Momchil Peak, Greenwich Island  
 Momino Point, Brabant Island
 Montana Bluff, Livingston Island 
 Montemno Lake, Livingston Island 
 Montojo Island, Biscoe Islands
 Monyak Hill, Sentinel Range 
 Morava Peak, Trinity Peninsula 
 Moriseni Peak, Alexander Island 
 Mount Moriya, Nordenskjöld Coast
 Mostich Hill, Rugged Island
 Mozgovitsa Glacier, Alexander Island  
 Mrahori Saddle, Nordenskjöld Coast
 Mraka Sound, Biscoe Islands
 Mugla Passage, Livingston Island  
 Muldava Glacier, Graham Coast  
 Mundraga Bay, Nordenskjöld Coast  
 Mureno Peak, Trinity Peninsula 
 Murgash Glacier, Greenwich Island  
 Mursalitsa Peak, Sentinel Range
 Musala Glacier, Greenwich Island
 Musina Glacier, Oscar II Coast

See also 
 Bulgarian toponyms in Antarctica

External links 
 Bulgarian Antarctic Gazetteer
 SCAR Composite Gazetteer of Antarctica
 Antarctic Digital Database (ADD). Scale 1:250000 topographic map of Antarctica with place-name search.
 L. Ivanov. Bulgarian toponymic presence in Antarctica. Polar Week at the National Museum of Natural History in Sofia, 2–6 December 2019

Bibliography 
 J. Stewart. Antarctica: An Encyclopedia. Jefferson, N.C. and London: McFarland, 2011. 1771 pp.  
 L. Ivanov. Bulgarian Names in Antarctica. Sofia: Manfred Wörner Foundation, 2021. Second edition. 539 pp.  (in Bulgarian)
 G. Bakardzhieva. Bulgarian toponyms in Antarctica. Paisiy Hilendarski University of Plovdiv: Research Papers. Vol. 56, Book 1, Part A, 2018 – Languages and Literature, pp. 104-119 (in Bulgarian)
 L. Ivanov and N. Ivanova. Bulgarian names. In: The World of Antarctica. Generis Publishing, 2022. pp. 114-115. 

Antarctica
 
Bulgarian toponyms in Antarctica
Names of places in Antarctica